JS or js may refer to:

Computing
 JavaScript, a high-level, just-in-time compiled, object-oriented programming language
 JScript, Microsoft's dialect of the ECMAScript standard used in Internet Explorer

Businesses and organizations
 Jonge Socialisten, a Dutch political group
 Air Koryo, North Korea's state-run airline, IATA code JS
 Jahangir Siddiqui & Co., a Pakistani financial services company
 JS Model, Chinese manufacturer of UAVs
 Jaffna Stallions, a team participating in Lanka Premier League
 United Serbia (Jedinstvena Srbija), a political party in Serbia
 JS Global, a Chinese manufacturer of home appliances

Other uses
 JS (band), an American female R&B duo
 "JS" (song), by Mamoru Miyano, 2009
 Japanese Ship, a ship prefix used by the Japanese military
 Jiangsu, a province of China
 Joule-second (J s, or J∙s), describing the amount of action, or the unit measure of angular momentum
 Joule/second (J/s), or watt, a unit of power
 IS tank family, an acronym for Joseph Stalin, sometimes anglicized as JS

See also

Sainsbury's, trade name of J Sainsbury plc, the UK's third largest chain of supermarkets